Margarosticha is a genus of moths of the family Crambidae.

Species
Margarosticha argyrograpta Hampson, 1917
Margarosticha aurantifusa Munroe, 1959
Margarosticha bimaculalis Snellen, 1880
Margarosticha euprepialis Hampson, 1917
Margarosticha gaudialis Hampson, 1917
Margarosticha leucozonalis Hampson, 1897
Margarosticha nesiotes Munroe, 1959
Margarosticha nigrescens Speidel, 2003
Margarosticha papuensis Munroe, 1959
Margarosticha plumbealis Kenrick, 1912
Margarosticha pulcherrimalis Lederer, 1863
Margarosticha repetitalis (Warren, 1896)
Margarosticha sphenotis Meyrick, 1887

Former species
Margarosticha australis (C. Felder, R. Felder & Rogenhofer, 1875)

References

  2003: New species of Aquatic moths from the Philippines (Lepidoptera: Crambidae). Insecta Koreana 20 (1): 7-49.
 , 1999: Catalogue of the Oriental Acentropinae (Lepidoptera: Crambidae). Tijdschrift voor Entomologie 142 (1): 125-142. Full article: .

External links
Crambidae genus list at Butterflies and Moths of the World of the Natural History Museum

Acentropinae
Crambidae genera
Taxa named by Julius Lederer